The Songstress is the debut solo album by the American R&B/soul singer Anita Baker. It was originally released in 1983 by Beverly Glen Music, and was Baker's only album for that label prior to signing with Elektra Records with whom she had a string of hit albums. The Songstress was not a commercial success upon its initial release, though the album met with moderate success on the R&B charts. It did have a 1984 compact disc release and was one of the first independently released compact Discs. Notorious drug trafficker "Freeway" Rick Ross helped provide the money for the album.

Baker became a major international success after signing with Elektra Records (a division of Warner Music Group) in 1986, and Elektra acquired the rights to The Songstress and re-released it with a new cover in 1991. Between 1992-2007, the album sold 307,000 copies in the US according to SoundScan figures.

Reception
"No More Tears" peaked at number 49 on Billboard's Hot Black Singles chart, becoming Baker's first entry on the Billboard's singles chart; "Angel," number five on the same chart; "You're the Best Thing Yet," number 28.

Alex Henderson of AllMusic rated the album three and a half stars, praising her ballads and 'slow jams' (such as "No More Tears", "Angel", and "You're the Best Thing Yet"), calling them "honest [and] heartfelt", along with faster material such as "Squeeze Me" (which he referred to as "a sweaty taste of gospel-drenched funk.

Track listing
 "Angel" (Patrick Moten, Sandra Sully) - 4:57
 "You're the Best Thing Yet"  (Moten, Geronne C. Turner) - 5:36
 "Feel The Need"  (Moten) - 5:35
 "Squeeze Me"  (Moten) - 4:40
 "No More Tears"  (Michael J. Powell) - 5:38
 "Sometimes"   (Moten, Sully) - 5:53
 "Will You Be Mine"   (Moten, Carlos Turrentine) - 5:24
 "Do You Believe Me" (Moten) - 3:55

Personnel
 Anita Baker – lead vocals
 Patrick Moten – keyboards, rhythm section arrangements, BGV arrangements
 David T. Walker – guitar
 Paul Jackson Jr. – guitar
 James Macon – guitar
 Craig Cooper – guitar
 Nathan East – bass
 Raymond Calhoun – drums
 James Gadson – drums
 Otis Smith – backing vocals arrangements
 Gene Page – string arrangements
 Anthony T. Coleman – string contractor
 Billy Page – string contractor
 "The Waters": Maxine Waters, Julia Waters, Luther Waters and Oren Waters – backing vocals
 Carmen Twillie – backing vocals
 Phil Perry – backing vocals
 Jim Gilstrap – backing vocals
 Clydene Jackson – backing vocals
 Bunny Hull – backing vocals

Production
 Executive Producer – Otis Smith
 Producers – Patrick Moten and Otis Smith
 Engineer – Barney Perkins
 Assistant Engineer – Tom Cummings
 Recorded at Kendun Recorders (Burbank, CA).
 Mastered by John Matousek at Hitsville Studios (Hollywood, CA).
 Digital Remastered and Edited by John Matousek and Gerard Smerek at Soundworks West (Hollywood, CA).
 Art Direction and Design – John Coulter Design
 Artwork – Ginny Livingston
 Original Photography – Richard Arrindell
 Front Cover and Inside Photo – Kevin Winter
 Back Cover Photo – Adrian Buckmaster

Charts

References

 

1983 debut albums
Anita Baker albums
albums arranged by Gene Page